This is a list of members of the Victorian Legislative Council between 1952 and 1955. As half of the Legislative Council's terms expired at each triennial election, half of these members were elected at the 1949 triennial election with terms expiring in 1955, while the other half were elected at the 1952 triennial election with terms expiring in 1958.

This was the first Legislative Council term where members were elected from the same electoral rolls as the Assembly. In 1955, before the triennial election, the Labor Party split, with some members leaving to form the Australian Labor Party (Anti-Communist), which became the Democratic Labor Party (DLP).

 On 21 May 1952, Colin McNally, Country MLC for North Western Province, died. Country candidate Arthur Mansell won the resulting by-election on 26 July 1952.
 On 9 December 1952, Trevor Harvey, Country MLC for Gippsland Province, died. Country candidate Bill Fulton won the resulting by-election on 21 February 1953.
 On 8 July 1953, Percival Inchbold, Country MLC for North Eastern Province, died. Country candidate Keith Bradbury won the resulting by-election on 22 August 1953.
 In June 1954, Archibald Fraser, Labor MLC for Melbourne North Province, resigned. Labor candidate Jack Little won the resulting by-election on 14 August 1954.
 On 20 November 1954, Sir James Kennedy, Liberal MLC for Higinbotham Province, died. Liberal candidate Lindsay Thompson won the resulting by-election on 29 January 1955.
 On 13 February 1955, Sir Frank Clarke, Liberal MLC for Monash, died. Liberal candidate Charles Gawith won the resulting by-election on 2 April 1955.

Sources
 Re-member (a database of all Victorian MPs since 1851). Parliament of Victoria.

Members of the Parliament of Victoria by term
20th-century Australian politicians